Manuel Iori (born 12 March 1982) is an Italian former professional footballer who played as a midfielder, and is currently a youth coach at Cittadella.

Playing career

Early career
Iori started his professional career at Varese of Serie C1. He then played for Serie D side Borgosesia before played 5 seasons in Serie C2.

Cittadella
In summer 2006 he joined Cittadella of Serie C1, where he won promotion playoffs in 2008. He played 41 out of 42 league matches in his first Serie B season, helped the newcomer finished just above the relegation line.

Chievo
In August 2009, he was signed by Chievo in a co-ownership bid. Antimo Iunco was sent to the club on loan later as part of the deal. After the injury of Luca Rigoni, he played as the starting central midfielder until the recovery of Rigoni. He also played at 2009–10 Coppa Italia against Frosinone, substituted Rigoni at the 54 minute, on 25 November 2009 and the match against ACF Fiorentina as starter, which both team rested numbers of regular starter. The match ended in a 2–3 loss.

In June 2010 Chievo bought him outright, co-currently Iunco who went on loan to Cittadella in 2009–10 season, was signed by Cittadella in co-ownership deal, for €500,000.

On 17 August 2010, he was loaned to Serie B side Livorno on loan with option to purchase.

Coaching career
On 20 July 2021, Iori was officially unveiled as the new coach in charge of the Primavera under-19 youth team at Cittadella, his last team as a player.

References

External links
 Profile at La Gazzetta dello Sport 
 Profile at Football.it 
 

Living people
1982 births
Sportspeople from Varese
Association football midfielders
Italian footballers
Italian football managers
S.S.D. Varese Calcio players
A.C. Meda 1913 players
A.S. Cittadella players
A.C. ChievoVerona players
U.S. Livorno 1915 players
Torino F.C. players
A.C. Cesena players
Calcio Padova players
Serie A players
Serie B players
Footballers from Lombardy